Morse is a lunar impact crater that is located on the far side of the Moon and cannot be seen directly from the Earth. It lies about one crater diameter to the southwest of the larger Fitzgerald. To the west-northwest of Morse is Dante.

This is a relatively well-defined crater with features that have not been markedly eroded by subsequent impacts. There is a small crater along the southeastern rim, however, and the southern rim is somewhat disrupted. The rim edge is uneven in places and there are terrace features along the inner walls to the northeast and west. The interior floor, while generally level, has a number of low irregularities forming small hills.

The crater lies at the northeast margin of the Freundlich-Sharonov Basin.

Satellite craters
By convention these features are identified on lunar maps by placing the letter on the side of the crater midpoint that is closest to Morse.

References

 
 
 
 
 
 
 
 
 
 
 
 

Impact craters on the Moon